Rich Sommer (born February 2, 1978) is an American actor, best known for his portrayal of Harry Crane on the AMC drama series Mad Men. He is also known for his roles in the comedy-drama films The Devil Wears Prada (2006), Celeste and Jesse Forever (2012), The Giant Mechanical Man (2012), and Hello, My Name Is Doris (2015), as well as voicing Henry in the 2016 video game Firewatch. He guest starred in a number of Elementary episodes. More recently, he portrayed Detective Dean Riley in The CW crime drama television series In the Dark (2019).

Early life and education
Sommer was born in Ohio and raised in Stillwater, Minnesota, where he was educated at Oak-Land Junior High School and Stillwater Area High School. He then went on to attend Concordia College in Moorhead, Minnesota, where he majored in theater and sang in The Concordia Choir. Sommer studied improvisation at the Brave New Workshop in Minneapolis, and started an improv group, the Slush Puppies, in Moorhead. In 2004, he received his Master of Fine Arts in acting from Case Western Reserve University in Cleveland, Ohio. Sommer returned to the school in 2006 to teach icebreakers to law students, and again in 2008 to do an improv workshop with undergraduate theatre students.

Career
Sommer's most notable film role to date is as Anne Hathaway's friend Doug in the 2006 film The Devil Wears Prada. He has appeared in commercials for companies such as Bud Light, Dairy Queen, Nextel, and Sprint.

From 2007 until its ending in 2015, Sommer maintained a regular role on AMC's period drama series Mad Men as Harry Crane, a media buyer who becomes head of the television department in a 1960s Madison Avenue ad agency. In 2008, Sommer appeared as a guest star in two episodes of NBC's mockumentary sitcom series The Office, portraying the role of Alex. In 2010, he played Jimmy Wilson in a guest appearance on Ugly Betty.

In 2011, Sommer guest starred in two episodes of The CW's drama-thriller series Nikita as electrical engineer and CIA consultant Malcolm Mitchell. The following year, he co-starred with Bob Odenkirk and Jenna Fischer in the romantic comedy film The Giant Mechanical Man. In May 2012, he began performances of the Roundabout Theatre Company's production of Harvey on Broadway, co-starring alongside Jim Parsons. Also that same year, he guest starred in NBC's police procedural series Law & Order: Special Victims Unit as Boyd Hartwell.

On March 1, 2014, it was reported that Sommer had been cast in the CBS pilot Good Session; however, the network later declined to pick up the project to series. In November 2014, Sommer reprised his role as Harlan Emple in an episode of CBS's procedural drama series Elementary, after guest starring as the character in an episode the previous year. From February 2 to March 13, 2016, Sommer starred in the Off-Broadway revival of Sam Shepard's play Buried Child, with Ed Harris and Amy Madigan. That same year, he also co-starred in Rob Reiner's biopic LBJ as Press Secretary Pierre Salinger, alongside Woody Harrelson in the title role.

In 2018, Sommer appeared in the horror mystery film Summer of 84, opposite Graham Verchere, Judah Lewis and Tiera Skovbye.

Sommer is a fan favorite on the podcast Never Not Funny, hosted by comedian and pioneer Jimmy Pardo. In 2020, he became a recurring guest on the streaming version of The George Lucas Talk Show, appearing as himself and as his own fictional roommate, Steven Charleston.

Personal life
Sommer lives in Los Angeles with his wife, Virginia Donohoe, whom he married on August 13, 2005. They have two children.

Sommer is a fan of tabletop games and hosts a podcast about them called CARDBOARD!

Filmography

Film

Television

Video games

Stage

Awards and nominations

References

External links

 
 
 
 

1978 births
21st-century American male actors
American bloggers
American male film actors
American male stage actors
American male television actors
American male video game actors
American male voice actors
Case Western Reserve University alumni
Living people
Male actors from Minnesota
Male actors from Toledo, Ohio
People from Stillwater, Minnesota
American male bloggers